The M7 is a planned motorway between Dadu and Hub. The highway is part of the north–south route from Islamabad to Karachi and forms the southernmost part of this route from Ratodero to Karachi in about 540 kilometers.

Alignment
At the town of Ratodero (near Sukkur) the M6 from Multan has to merge into the M7, while crossing the M8, the highway to Gwadar at the border with Iran . The M7 then runs south along the river Indus, and serves several cities, of which Larkana is the most important. However, this last route must pass through the Kirthar Range, a low mountain range.

References

External links
 National Highway Authority
 Pakistan National Highways & Motorway Police

M07
Proposed roads in Pakistan